The 1874 Boston Red Stockings season was the 4th season of the franchise. They won their third consecutive National Association championship.

Managed by Harry Wright, Boston finished with a record of 52–18 to win the pennant by 7.5 games. Pitcher Al Spalding started 69 of the Red Stockings' games and led the NA with 52 wins. Outfielder Cal McVey led the league with 71 runs batted in, and he paced the Boston offense which scored more runs than any other team.

Harry Wright, Al Spalding, first baseman Jim O'Rourke, catcher Deacon White, and shortstop George Wright have all been elected into the Baseball Hall of Fame.

Regular season

Season standings

Record vs. opponents

Roster

Player stats

Batting

Starters by position 
Note: Pos = Position; G = Games played; AB = At bats; H = Hits; Avg. = Batting average; HR = Home runs; RBI = Runs batted in

Other batters 
Note: G = Games played; AB = At bats; H = Hits; Avg. = Batting average; HR = Home runs; RBI = Runs batted in

Pitching

Starting pitchers 
Note: G = Games pitched; IP = Innings pitched; W = Wins; L = Losses; ERA = Earned run average; SO = Strikeouts

Relief pitchers 
Note: G = Games pitched; IP = Innings pitched; W = Wins; L = Losses; ERA = Earned run average; SO = Strikeouts

References 

1874 Boston Red Stockings season at Baseball Reference

Boston Red Stockings seasons
Boston Red Stockings
Boston Red Stockings
Boston Red Stockings
19th century in Boston